Countess Géraldine Margit Virginia Olga Mária Apponyi de Nagy-Appony (6 August 1915 – 22 October 2002) was Queen of the Albanians from her marriage to King Zog I on 27 April 1938 until the King was deposed on 7 April of the following year.

Geraldine was born in Austria-Hungary into the noble Apponyi family. Her family fled to Switzerland in 1918, when the monarchy of Austria-Hungary was abolished. They returned to Hungary in 1921. However, after her father Gyula died in 1924, her American-born mother Gladys took Geraldine and her two siblings to live in southern France. Later Geraldine was educated at a boarding school in Austria. She met the Albanian king Zog I in 1938, and they married shortly afterwards.

The Italian invasion of Albania cut short Zog's reign. During World War II, King Zog and Queen Geraldine lived first in France and later in England. Later on, they would live in France again and in Egypt. After her husband died in Paris in 1961, Geraldine took the title Queen Mother and asserted the rights of her son Leka I, Crown Prince of Albania, to rule. She and Leka fled successively to Spain, Rhodesia, and South Africa. Geraldine was allowed to return to Albania in 2002, and she died that year aged 87.

Early life

Geraldine was born in Budapest, Austria-Hungary, a daughter of Count Gyula Apponyi de Nagy-Appony (1873–1924), Grand Marshal of the Hungarian Court, of the old and noble Apponyi family which had been great landowners in Upper Hungary since the 13th century. Her mother was Gladys Virginia Steuart (1891–1947), an American, daughter of John Henry Steuart, a diplomat who served as US Consul in Antwerp, Belgium, and his wife Mary Virginia Ramsay Harding (later Mrs. Gustaf Stråle af Ekna), who both came from monied families of the New World, specifically Virginia, Maryland and North Carolina.

When Geraldine was three, the Empire of Austria-Hungary collapsed, and the Apponyi family went to live in Switzerland. In 1921 they returned to the Kingdom of Hungary which was stable under Regent Miklós Horthy. However, when Geraldine's father died in 1924, her mother and their three children (Geraldine, now nine, Virginia, and Gyula) went to live in the resort of Menton, in the south of France. When the Countess married a French officer, her Hungarian in-laws insisted that the children be returned to Hungary for their schooling. The girls were sent to the Sacred Heart boarding school in Pressbaum, near Vienna. Geraldine's happy childhood then continued at the chateau Oponice (Appony) in present-day Slovakia, Apponyi ancestral family possessions in Slovakia; at the time, the part of Czechoslovakia (whose citizenship Geraldine gained). She lived there until 1938. Her family's fortune spent, Geraldine earned a living as a shorthand typist. She also worked in the gift shop of the Budapest National Museum, where her uncle was the director.

Royal life

Geraldine was introduced in December 1937 to King Zog I of the Albanians, who had seen a photograph of her. She visited the Albanian Kingdom and within days the couple were engaged to be married. Known as the "White Rose of Hungary", Geraldine was raised to royal status as Princess Geraldine of Albania prior to her wedding.

On 27 April 1938, in Tirana, Albania, Geraldine married the King in a ceremony witnessed by Galeazzo Ciano, envoy and son-in-law of Il Duce and Prime Minister of Italy, Benito Mussolini. She was Roman Catholic and King Zog was Muslim. Geraldine wore a new diamond tiara, specially commissioned from Austrian jewellers, featuring the motifs of the white rose for the bride, and the heraldic goat for the groom. They drove to their honeymoon in an open-top scarlet Mercedes-Benz 540K, a present from Adolf Hitler.

The couple had one son, Crown Prince Leka Zogu (1939–2011).

Zog's rule was cut short by the Italian invasion of Albania in April 1939, and the family fled the country into exile. From April 1939, Geraldine and Zog fled Albania via Greece and Turkey and settled in France, and then in England. They lived in the Ritz Hotel, London, at Ascot and, for most of the war, at Parmoor House, Frieth, Buckinghamshire, England. In 1946 they went to Egypt, and then in 1952 to France. King Zog I died in Hauts-de-Seine, France, in 1961 and their son, Crown Prince Leka, was proclaimed King Leka I by the royalist government in exile. Following this, the Royal Family moved to Spain, Rhodesia and then South Africa.

Later life
After her husband's death, Geraldine preferred to be known as the "Queen Mother of Albania". In June 2002, Geraldine returned from South Africa to live in Albania, after the law was changed to allow her to do so. She continued to assert that her son Leka was the legitimate King of the Albanians.

Queen Geraldine of the Albanians died five months later at the age of 87 in a military hospital in Tirana. After being admitted for treatment for lung disease, she suffered at least three heart attacks, the last of which was fatal, on 22 October 2002. She was buried by the Central House of the Army with full honours, including a funeral oration at St Paul's Cathedral, on 26 October 2002, and interred in the Sharra cemetery, Albania, in the "VIP plot". She was later reburied in the Royal Mausoleum in Tirana.

On 5 April 2004 her grandson, Leka, Crown Prince of Albania, accepted the Mother Teresa Medal awarded to her posthumously by the Albanian government in recognition of her charitable efforts for the people of Albania. Leka's daughter Geraldine (born 22 October 2020 at Queen Geraldine Maternity Hospital in Tirana, on the 18th death anniversary of queen Geraldine) was named in her honour.

Honours
  Knight Grand Cross of the Order of Fidelity (26 April 1938).
  Mother Teresa Medal [posthumous] (5 April 2004).

References

Further reading
Dedet, Joséphine "Géraldine, reine des Albanais". Paris: Belfond, 2016, published at the occasion of Prince Leka's wedding in Tirana, on 8 October 2016 (Leka being Geraldine's grandson); former editions: Criterion, 1997  and Belfond, 2012, . Biography enriched by the Queen's testimony, by her personal archives and by a huge correspondence with the author, who has benefited of many unpublished sources.
Dedet, Joséphine, Géraldine, Egy Magyar No Albania Tronjan, Budapest : Europa, 2015, reprinted in 2016 and December 2017, best-seller in Hungary, translation of Géraldine, reine des Albanais".
Pearson, O. S. Albania and King Zog, I.B. Tauris. 2005.
Tomes, Jason King Zog, Self-Made Monarch of Albania, Stroud: Sutton, 2003 
 Rees, Neil. A Royal Exile: King Zog & Queen Geraldine of Albania including their wartime exile in the Thames Valley and Chilterns, 2010 
The Economist, 7 November 2002 – Queen Geraldine of Albania.
The Independent, 24 October 2004, Obituary. 
 Patrice Najbor, Histoire de l'Albanie et de sa maison royale (5 volumes), JePublie, Paris, 2008,.
 Patrice Najbor, La dynastie des Zogu, Textes & Prétextes, Paris, 2002
 Robyns, Gwen. Geraldine of the Albanians. The Authorised Biography'', Muller, Blond & White (1987)

External links 
 BBC news report of her death
 The Economist – obituary
 muzem.sk
 Maison royale d'Albanie, site officiel en langue française
 Famille royale d'Albanie, site officiel en langue anglaise

|-

|-

1915 births
2002 deaths
Nobility from Budapest
Albanian royal consorts
20th-century Albanian people
Apponyi family
Albanian nobility
Hungarian emigrants
Albanian people of American descent
Hungarian people of American descent
Albanian royalty
House of Zogu
Hungarian Roman Catholics
Albanian anti-communists
Immigrants to Albania
Hungarian expatriates in France